The men's 500 metres in speed skating at the 1968 Winter Olympics took place on 14 February, at the L'Anneau de Vitesse.

Records
Prior to this competition, the existing world and Olympic records were as follows:

Results

References

Men's speed skating at the 1968 Winter Olympics